The Handball events at the 1994 Asian Games were held at the Higashiku Sports Center, Hiroshima, Japan between 5 October 1994 and 14 October 1994.

Schedule

Medalists

Medal table

Final standing

Men

Women

References
 Results – Men
 Results – Women
 Korea Handball Federation

External links
Official website

 
1994 Asian Games events
1994
Asian Games
1994 Asian Games